Shree Janata Higher Secondary School is a public high school in the West Amawa, Ward number 6, Rupandehi, Nepal.

Secondary schools in Nepal

Educational institutions with year of establishment missing